Chorfa is a town and commune in Bouïra Province, Algeria.

References

Communes of Bouïra Province